Unit Ei 1644 — also known as Unit 1644, Detachment Ei 1644, Detachment Ei, Detachment Tama, The Nanking Detachment, or simply Unit Ei, was a Japanese laboratory and biological warfare facility under control of the Epidemic Prevention and Water Purification Department. It was established in 1939 in Japanese-occupied Nanking as a satellite unit of Unit 731. It had 12 branches and employed about 1,500 men.

During the Second Sino-Japanese War, Unit Ei engaged in "producing on a mass scale lethal bacteria to be used as weapons against the Chinese forces and civilian population" and "took a direct
part in employing bacteriological weapons against the Chinese forces and local inhabitants during the military operations of the Japanese troops," according to its Chief, Shunji Sato.

Human experiments
Sato claimed in his testimony that Unit Ei "did not conduct experiments on human beings." 

An anonymous researcher, who claims he was attached to Unit 1644, says that it regularly carried out human vivisections as well as infecting humans with cholera, typhus, and bubonic plague. The researcher and his family had not yet reached an agreement about releasing his name.

The human experiments on Unit Ei 1644 took place in the confines of the fourth floor in the facility, which was out of bounds for the majority of the Unit Ei 1644. Reportedly, only a minority of the staff took part in the BW experiments on humans at Unit Ei 1644, such as the unit's doctors and high level technicians. Each week between ten to twenty persons were exposed to poisons, germs and different gases, and about ten were killed weekly by gases, lethal injections and bullets after having been used as test subjects. 

A soldier stationed at the Unit testified, that ordinary soldiers were not allowed beyond the second floor and not informed that human experiments were taking place there, but they were aware of rumours to that effect. The soldier had heard that they were prisoners kept at the fourth floor, and was told by an officer: "There is a lumber storage facility on the fourth floor. You never go above the second floor, you got it."
There was an incinerator in the Unit in which dead prisoners were cremated.  

When the war ended, the remaining test subjects were killed, the East Zhingsahn Street complex was destroyed with explosive charges and the staff evacuated.

Capabilities 
Sato testified that while Chief of the Unit, it was "devising bacteriological weapons and producing them on a mass scale. For this purpose the Nanking Detachment Ei was supplied with high-capacity equipment and with bacteriological experts, and it produced lethal bacteria on a mass scale. Under my direction ... the Training Division every year trained about 300 bacteriologists with the object of employing them in bacteriological warfare."

According to Sato, "...the output of bacteria substance was 10 kilograms per production cycle." The facility also bred fleas for the purposes of plague infection.

Sato also testified about the equipment of Unit Ei, "The output capacity of the Nanking Detachment Ei 1644 for the production of lethal bacteria was up to 10 kilograms per production cycle." To produce this quantity of bacteria, Detachment Ei 1644 had the following equipment:
 Ishii cultivators, about 200; incubator room, 1, dimensions 5x5x3 meters;
 2 cylindrical autoclaves, 1 .5 meters in diameter and 2.5 meters long;
 incubators, about 40-50
 steam sterilizers, 40-50
 Koch boilers, about 40-50,
and for cooking media, the detachment had large retorts..."

Members 
The first Chief of Unit Ei was Ishii Shiro, then Colonel Oota. In February 1943, Sato was appointed Chief of Unit Ei. He served as Chief until February 1944. Sato testified at the Khabarovsk War Crime Trials that Unit Ei "possessed high-capacity equipment for the breeding of germs for bacteriological warfare."

Lieutenant Colonel Onadera was Chief of the General Division.
Captain Murata was in charge of breeding fleas.

Biological warfare 
In late August 1942, Unit Ei participated in a biological attack against Chinese citizens and soldiers in Yushan County, Jinhua, and Fuqing. As Kawashima Kiyoshi testified, "..[The] bacteriological weapon was employed on the ground, the contaminating of the territory being done by sabotage action. ... The advancing Chinese troops entered the contaminated zone and came under the action of the bacteriological weapon." Cholera and plague cultures used during the attack were made at Unit Ei. Sato testified he was told that "plague, cholera and paratyphoid germs were employed against the Chinese by spraying. The plague germs were disseminated through fleas, the other germs in the pure form—by contaminating reservoirs, wells, rivers, etc." The plague fleas were also from Unit Ei.

Aftermath
When the war ended, the remaining test subjects were killed, the East Zhingsahn Street complex was destroyed with explosive charges and the staff evacuated.

References

Japanese human subject research
Biological warfare facilities
Chemical warfare
Imperial Japanese Army
Second Sino-Japanese War
Second Sino-Japanese War crimes
Japanese war crimes